Thundering Trails is a 1943 American Western "Three Mesquiteers" B-movie directed by John English and starring Bob Steele, Tom Tyler, and Jimmie Dodd.

Cast 
 Bob Steele as Tucson Smith
 Tom Tyler as Stony Brooke
 Jimmie Dodd as Lullaby Joslin
 Nell O'Day as Edith Walker
 Sam Flint as Judge Morgan
 Karl Hackett as Henchman Mollison
 Charles Miller as Texas Ranger Captain Sam Brooke, Stony's Father
 John James as Johnny Brooke, Stony's Brother
 Forrest Taylor as Ben Walker
 Ed Cassidy as Rancher Joe Patterson (as Edward Cassidy)
 Forbes Murray as Commissioner Arthur Howland
 Reed Howes as Henchman Jeff Cantrell
 Bud Geary as Henchman Blake

References

External links 

1943 films
1943 Western (genre) films
American Western (genre) films
American black-and-white films
Films directed by John English
Republic Pictures films
Three Mesquiteers films
1940s English-language films
1940s American films